The ESPN College Football Broadcast Teams are listed in the table below, including games broadcast on ABC, ESPN, ESPN2, ESPNU, ESPN News, ACC Network, SEC Network, Longhorn Network, and ESPN Radio.

Note: All ESPN games are also simulcast on the ESPN App.

Broadcast pairings for college football are weekly and are subject to change.

2020s

2022

2021

2020

Note: Because of the COVID-19 pandemic, sideline reporters rotated between crews to reduce travel.

2010s

2019

2018

2017

2016

2015

2014

2013

2012

2011

2010

2000s

2009

2008

2007

2006

2005

2004

References

Lists of college football broadcasters
ABC Sports
College Football broadcast teams